The Sanremo Music Festival 1964 was the 14th annual Sanremo Music Festival, held at the Sanremo Casino in Sanremo, province of Imperia between 30 January and 1 February 1964.

The show was presented by Mike Bongiorno, assisted by Giuliana Lojodice. Gianni Ravera served as artistic director.
  
According to the rules of this edition every song was performed in a double performance by a couple of singers or groups. The winners of the Festival were Gigliola Cinquetti and Patricia Carli with the song "Non ho l'età".

Participants and results

References 

Sanremo Music Festival by year
1964 in Italian music
1964 in music
1964 music festivals